MXR may refer to:
 MXR, a New-York-based manufacturer of effects pedals from Rochester
 MX Aircraft MXR, a single-seat aerobatic aircraft built by MX Aircraft Company
 ISO 639:mxr, the ISO 639 code for the Murik Kayan language
 Myrhorod Air Base, the IATA code MXR
 MXR, the alias of Moussoro Airport